James McLeod (b. 1836 to 1840 - d. June 5, 1898) was a Union Navy sailor in the American Civil War and a recipient of a Medal of Honor (the U.S. military's highest decoration), for his actions at the Battle of Forts Jackson and St. Philip.

Military service
Born in Glasgow, Scotland, McLeod immigrated to the United States and was living in Bucksport, Maine when he joined the U.S. Navy. For this action, he was awarded the Medal of Honor a year later on April 3, 1863.

Medal of Honor citation
Rank and organization: Captain of the Foretop, U.S. Navy. Born: Scotland. Accredited to: Maine. G.O. No.: 11, 3 April 1863.

McLeod's official Medal of Honor citation reads:
Captain of foretop, and a volunteer from the Colorado, McLeod served on board the U.S.S. Pensacola during the attack upon Forts Jackson and St. Philip and the taking of New Orleans, 24 and 25 April 1862. Acting as gun captain of the rifled howitzer aft which was much exposed, he served this piece with great ability and activity, although no officer superintended it.

References

External links 
 

Year of birth unknown
Year of death unknown
Scottish emigrants to the United States
People of Maine in the American Civil War
Union Navy sailors
United States Navy Medal of Honor recipients
Scottish-born Medal of Honor recipients
American Civil War recipients of the Medal of Honor
Year of birth uncertain